The 2013 Southern Miss Golden Eagles football team represented the University of Southern Mississippi in the 2013 NCAA Division I FBS football season as a member of the East Division of Conference USA. They were led by first-year head coach Todd Monken and played their home games at M. M. Roberts Stadium in Hattiesburg, Mississippi. They finished the season 1–11, 1–7 in C-USA play to finish in a three-way tie for fifth place in the East Division.

Schedule

Schedule Source:

Game summaries

Texas State

at Nebraska

at Arkansas

at Boise State

FIU

at East Carolina

North Texas

at Marshall

at Louisiana Tech

Florida Atlantic

Middle Tennessee

at UAB

References

Southern Miss
Southern Miss Golden Eagles football seasons
Southern Miss Golden Eagles football